Sarah Marie Bartlett (born 7 December 1981) is an English cricket umpire and former cricketer. She played domestic cricket for Middlesex and Hertfordshire. She umpired her first international match in 2022, during the South Africa women tour of England.

References

External links
 
 

1981 births
Living people
English cricket umpires
Sportspeople from London
Middlesex women cricketers
Hertfordshire women cricketers